Orthetrum sabina, the slender skimmer or green marsh hawk, is a species of dragonfly in the family Libellulidae. 
It is widespread, being found from south-eastern Europe and North Africa to Japan and south to Australia and Micronesia.

Description and habitat
It is a medium-sized dragonfly with a wingspan of 60-85mm. Adults are grayish to greenish yellow with black and pale markings and green eyes. Its abdomen is greenish-yellow, marked with black. It is very similar to Orthetrum serapia in appearance, with both species appearing in northern Australia. Pale markings on segment four of the abdomen do not extend into the posterior section when viewed from above on Orthetrum sabina. Females are similar to males in shape, color and size; differing only in sexual characteristics. This dragonfly perches motionless on shrubs and dry twigs for long periods. It voraciously preys on smaller butterflies and dragonflies.

Gallery

See also
 List of odonates of Sri Lanka
 List of odonates of India
 List of odonata of Kerala
 List of Odonata species of Australia

References

External links

Libellulidae
Odonata of Australia
Odonata of Oceania
Odonata of Asia
Odonata of Africa
Insects of New Guinea
Insects of Indonesia
Insects of Southeast Asia
Insects of Australia
Taxa named by Dru Drury
Insects described in 1770